The Schmerenbeck Educational Centre for Gifted and Talented Children, an organisation based at the University of the Witwatersrand in Johannesburg, South Africa, promoted, encouraged and fostered the education of gifted children within South Africa without regard to race. The centre was originally housed on campus in portable prefabricated buildings before it moved to a house in the Johannesburg suburb of Parktown opposite the University of the Witwatersrand's Education Department until it closed in 1995.

History 
The Association for the Education of Gifted Children in South Africa was established in 1971. In 1973, Ami Schmerenbeck of Windhoek showed interest in the education of gifted children. After her death in April 1975, her sister, Suzanne Sittman, trustee of the Schmerenbeck estate, negotiated regarding the establishment of the "Ami and Kurt Schmerenbeck Fund". It was agreed that a portion of the bequest be used to establish a centre and on 26 February 1977 Sittman formally opened the "Schmerenbeck Educational Centre".

References 

Eriksson. G.I. (1990) Initiation and Development of the Schmerenbeck Educational Centre: 1970-1990.  Report: University of The Witwatersrand, Johannesburg, South Africa.
Eriksson (1985) Reflections on Giftedness: A Guide for Students, Parents and Teachers.  Pretoria: HAUM Publishers
Adams H. B.; Wallace, B (1993) World Perspectives on the Gifted Disadvantaged.  London: AB Academic

University of the Witwatersrand
Education in Johannesburg
Gifted education
Alternative education